Vedette (1854–1881) was a British Thoroughbred racehorse who won the 2000 Guineas Stakes and two Doncaster Cups. He also sired Epsom Derby winner and Champion sire, Galopin. He was owned by Thomas Dundas, 2nd Earl of Zetland and trained by George Abdale.

Background
Vedette was bred by Mr. Chilton and Anthony Harrison and was a brown (almost black) colt foaled in 1854. He was sired by Epsom Derby and St. Leger Stakes winner Voltigeur. His dam was Mrs. Ridgway, a daughter of Birdcatcher.

Racing career

1856: two-year-old season
In August 1856 he finished third in the Eglington Stakes over one mile at York. The race was won by the favourite Augury. In October he won the Bedford Stakes at by two lengths from The Western Power, after starting as the 4/6 favourite. At the end of the year he was priced around 7/1 for the 1857 2000 Guineas Stakes.

1857: three-year-old season
Vedette returned to the racecourse as a three-year-old in the 2000 Guineas Stakes at Newmarket. He started the one-mile race as the 5/2 favourite of the eleven strong field. Also near the front of the betting were Loyola at 4/1, Kent at 9/2 and Anton at 5/1. The horses got away to an even break on the second start attempt and Turbit immediately took the lead, with Vedette a few lengths behind in fourth place. As they neared the closing stages Loyola (who was racing with Anton on the other side of the track) and Vedette caught and passed Turbit. Anton was winning by about a length in the final furlong, but Vedette produced a "tremendous rush" and overtook him in the last 50 yards. Vedette won the race by three quarters of a length from Anton, who finished a head in front a third placed Loyola. After winning the 2000 Guineas Vedette was very lame and had to hobble back from the weighing room to his stable. He was unable to run until the Great Yorkshire Stakes at York in August, where he was the 2/5 favourite. He won the race by three lengths from Skirmisher, with Saunterer about three lengths further behind in third place. Vedette then went to Doncaster and won the Fitzwilliam Stakes by a neck from Princess Royal. His final race of the season came in the Doncaster Cup, which he won by a neck from Black Tommy.

1858: four-year-old season
Vedette's first race as a four-year-old came on 9 April 1858 in the Port Stakes at Newmarket. The race was over a distance just short of two miles and Vedette started as the 4/6 favourite. He led his only opponent, Odd Trick, in the early stages, but was then overtaken and was beaten by three quarters of a length. Vedette then won the Great Ebor Handicap by half a length from Tunstall Maid, after starting as the 5/2 favourite. Tunstall Maid was a further three lengths clear of third placed Fisherman. Vedette's final race came in the Doncaster Cup. Vedette started as the 1/2 favourite, with Saunterer next in the betting at 6/1, then Fisherman at 7/1 and Black Tommy at 100/8. Vedette won the two and a half mile race by half a length from Saunterer, with Black Tommy a further six lengths behind in third place. His win was thought of as a win for all of Yorkshire and apparently there hadn't been "such cheering and waving of hats" since Voltigeur won the St Leger Stakes and Doncaster Cup in 1850.

Assessment
Vedette was generally regarded as the best of the 1854 foals.

Stud record
Verdette sired Speculum who won the Goodwood Cup and City and Suburban Handicap. Speculum was also a successful sire, with his progeny including Epsom Derby winner Sefton and becoming British Champion sire in 1878. Verdette's best son was Galopin who won the Epsom Derby in 1875 and was British Champion sire three times. Vedette's sire line survives today mainly through Galopin's son, the undefeated St. Simon, who was Champion sire nine times.

Pedigree

Note: b. = Bay, blk. = Black, br. = Brown, ch. = Chestnut

* Vedette was inbred 3x4 to Blacklock. This means that the stallion appears once in the third generation and once in the fourth generation of his pedigree.

References

1854 racehorse births
1881 racehorse deaths
Racehorses trained in the United Kingdom
Racehorses bred in the United Kingdom
Thoroughbred family 19-b
2000 Guineas winners